Santeros de Aguada was a Puerto Rican professional basketball team of the Baloncesto Superior Nacional. The team was based in Aguada, Puerto Rico. The team moved to Fajardo in 2021, changing their name and re-branding to Cariduros de Fajardo with the move.

History 
The team was founded in 1992 and participated in the now defunct Liga Puertorriqueña de Baloncesto during seven seasons before folding in 1998 due to financial problems. In 2016 the team was refounded and joined the Baloncesto Superior Nacional for the 2016 season with the purchase of the Maratonistas de Coamo franchise and later relocation to Aguada, Puerto Rico.

The team reached the 2019 BSN Finals against the Ponce Lions, winning the franchise's first and only national championship within the BSN league, four games to two, after winning a Game Five in which they trailed by 18 points with four minutes to go.

Home arenas 

 Cancha All-Star de Aguada (1992–1998)
 Ismael Delgado Coliseum (2016–present)

Team roster

Notable players
To appear in this section a player must have either:
- Set a club record or won an individual award as a professional player.
- Played at least one official international match for his senior national team at any time.

 Carlos Emory
 Christopher Gaston
 John Holland
 Juan Ramon Rivas
 Ricky Sánchez
 Daniel Johnson
 Rafael Hettsheimeir
 Rigoberto Mendoza
 Omar Samhan
 Derrick Byars
 Stedmon Lemon
 Dexter Pittman
 Ricky Ledo
 Chane Behanan
 Lamar Patterson
 Albert Burditt
 Danya Abrams
 Sean Green
 Abdul Shamsid-Deen

References

External links
 Baloncesto Superior Nacional website 

Aguada, Puerto Rico
Basketball teams established in 2016
BSN teams